Force It is the fourth studio album by English rock band UFO, released in 1975. It was their first album to chart in the United States.

The album was produced by Ten Years After bass player Leo Lyons. Another Ten Years After member, Chick Churchill, played Fender Rhodes electric piano keyboard, the first use of that instrument on a UFO record.

The CD reissue was remastered at Sound Recording Technology in Cambridge in 1994.

Album cover
The somewhat controversial original album cover was designed by Hipgnosis, as were almost all other UFO album covers of the 1970s. The nudity on the cover verged on breaching decency standards and the sexes of the couple in the bathtub were not known for several years. The models were later revealed to be Genesis P-Orridge and Cosey Fanni Tutti, both later of the influential industrial band Throbbing Gristle. The artwork was softened for the initial US release, making the couple in the bathtub transparent. The cover is a pun – there are multiple taps (British English) or "faucets" (US English) in the picture, which is a play on the album's title.

Critical reception 
Reviewing the LP in Christgau's Record Guide: Rock Albums of the Seventies (1981), Robert Christgau wrote: "Heavy metal that's not hard to take? What? Well, the whole first side moves to [sic] smartly you could almost mistake it for rock and roll." Eduardo Rivadavia, reviewer for AllMusic, wrote: "One of the band's best albums, Force It will not disappoint lovers of '70s English hard rock."

Track listing

Personnel
UFO
 Phil Mogg – vocals
 Andy Parker – drums
 Pete Way – bass
 Michael Schenker – guitar

Additional musician
Chick Churchill – keyboards

Production
Leo Lyons – producer
Mike Bobak, Mike Thompson – engineers
Hipgnosis – cover art

Charts

References

UFO (band) albums
1975 albums
Albums with cover art by Hipgnosis
Albums produced by Leo Lyons
Chrysalis Records albums
Albums recorded at Morgan Sound Studios